Prof. Yousaf Saleem Chishti (
1895 – 1984), known as Yusuf Salim Chishti, was a Pakistani eminent scholar and writer. He was the interpreter and commentator of Allama Mohammed Iqbal's work and worked with him from 1925 to 1938 predominantly.

Early life and education
Born in Bareilly (India) in 1895, Muhammad Yousaf Khan (Later known as Yousaf Saleem Chishti) got his early education in Allahabad. He obtained BA Honors in Philosophy from Aligarh Muslim University (1918) and in 1924 he did his MA Philosophy from Ahmedabad University.

Career
He taught in Forman Christian College Lahore and from 1929 to 1943, he served as Principal, Ashaat e Islam College Lahore. In 1948, he shifted to Karachi and started his literary career. He has very close relations with Quaid e Azam Muhammad Ali Jinnah and Allama Muhammad Iqbal, he used to attend meetings in Javid Manzil, Lahore (Allama Muhammad Iqbal's residence). He recorded conversations in his diaries but in 1955 most of them were destroyed by an upsurge in Ravi, at Lahore. He is famous for his commentaries on Allama Muhammad Iqbal's works and these commentaries are particularly known to be grounded in philosophy and comparative religion, as he was particularly knowledgeable in Hinduism, as "during his stay in Lahore, he met Lala Lajpat Roy Lahori and on his advice studied Vedas and Shastras from a Hindu pundit. Later, Swami Prakash Anand taught him Upanishads, Gita and Hindu philosophy of mysticism."

Literary works
He has written many books and his major subject was Iqbal and his poetry. His books include:
 Sharah Asrar-i-Khudi
 Sharah Rumuz-i-Bekhudi
 Sharah Payam-i-Mashriq
 Sharah Bang-i-Dara
 Sharah Zabur-i-Ajam
 Sharah Javid Nama
 Sharah Bal-i-Jibril
 Sharah Zarb-i Kalim
 Sharah Pas Cheh Bayed Kard ai Aqwam-e-Sharq
 Sharah Armughan-e-Hijaz (in Persian and Urdu)
 Commentary on Mohkamat Alam-e-Qurani
 Commentary on Diwan-e-Ghalib
Radha Krishnan Aur Iqbal: Mumasilat-o-Mutabiqat Afkaar
Taleemat-e-Iqbal
Sharah Rumi-e-Asr: Iqbal Ki Nazmein
Anwar-e-Mujaddidi
Allama Iqbal Marhoom: Hayat, Falsafa, Paygham
 Maulana Syed Hussain Ahmad Madni Ke Baare Mai Sabiqa Gustakhana Aur Touheen Aamez Rawayye Par Aetiraf-e-Taqseer-o-Nadamat 
 Allama Iqbal Marhoom Ke Ash’ar Mutaliqa Syed Hussain Ahmad Madni Ki Zaruri Wazahat
 Tareekh Tasawwuf ma Islami Tasawwuf Mai Ghayr Islami Nazriyat ki Aamezish

See also
Pakistan
Muhammad Ali Jinnah
 Allama Muhammad Iqbal
Iqbal Academy Pakistan
Iqbal Cyber Library

References

External links
http://www.allamaiqbal.com/ Official website For Allama Muhammad Iqbal
http://www.iqbalcyberlibrary.net/ Iqbal Cyber Library 
http://urduadab4u.blogspot.com/2011/08/yousuf-saleem-chishti-eminent-scholar.htmlProf. Yousaf Saleem Chishti

Iqbal scholars
Academic staff of the Forman Christian College
Pakistani Sunni Muslims
1895 births
1984 deaths
Chishtis